Take It from Me is a 1937 British comedy film directed by William Beaudine and starring Max Miller, Betty Lynne and Buddy Baer. It is often referred to by its working title, Transatlantic Trouble. 
Ahead of its opening in Australia, the filmmakers were sued there by a Lady Fairhaven who complained that a character in the film with the same name could be confused for her. The case was settled out of court. Existing cast lists only refer to a "Lady Foxham"; it is possible the offending name was ultimately overdubbed. It is now believed to be a lost film.

Plot
A British boxing promoter tries to get an opportunity for his man to fight for the title in America.

Cast
 Max Miller - Albert Hall
 Buddy Baer - Kid Brody
 James Stephenson - Lewis

References

External links

1937 films
1937 comedy films
1930s English-language films
Films directed by William Beaudine
British comedy films
British black-and-white films
Lost British films
1937 lost films
Lost comedy films
1930s British films